Fousseny Coulibaly (born 12 December 1992) is an Ivorian professional footballer who plays for Tunisian club Espérance de Tunis, as a midfielder.

Club career
Coulibaly has played for Stella Club, US Monastir, Espérance and Stade Tunisien.

International career
Coulibaly made one appearance for Ivory Coast in 2013. In December 2017 he announced his intention to apply for Tunisian citizenship and to represesent the Tunisian national team. In February 2018 it was announced that Coulibaly's application would not be processed in time for the 2018 FIFA World Cup. He made his return to the Ivorian team during the 2021 Africa Cup of Nations qualification, appeared as a substitution in Ivory Coast's 3–0 win over Niger.

References

1992 births
Living people
Ivorian footballers
Ivory Coast international footballers
Stella Club d'Adjamé players
US Monastir (football) players
Espérance Sportive de Tunis players
Stade Tunisien players
Association football midfielders
Ivorian expatriate footballers
Ivorian expatriate sportspeople in Tunisia
Expatriate footballers in Tunisia